Dhanamanjuri University is a state university located in Imphal, Manipur, India. it was established through The Dhanamanjuri University Act, 2017 which came into force on 6 April 2018.

The University was named after Maharani Dhanamanjuri Devi, the wife of Maharaj  Churachand Singh.

The university was established under the National Scheme of Rashtriya Uchchatar Shiksha Abhiyan (RUSA) as fulfilment of one of its primary components i.e., to convert colleges to cluster Universities. Maharani Dhanamanjuri gifted us Dhanamanjuri College and in recognition of her contribution to the development of Higher Education, the university is named after Maharani Dhanamanjuri. The university is built up of the three Dhanamanjuri Colleges namely DM College of Science, DM College of Arts, DM College of Commerce along with G.P. Women's College and LMS Law College.

DM University at present is functioning from DM College campus situated in the heart of Imphal city and the campus is bounded by National Highway No.2 in the East, Thangmeiband road in the West and North, and the Nambul River in the South. Ghanapriya Women's College is located at the South West of Kangla, the Old palace of Manipur near the Raj Bhavan and LMS Law College is located just in-front of the DM Campus crossing the National Highway No.2.

Constituent colleges 

 D.M.College of Arts, Imphal
 D.M.College of Commerce, Imphal
 D.M.College of Science, Imphal
 G.P. Women's College, Imphal
 L.M.S. Law College, Imphal (Professional)

Administrative structure

References

Universities in Manipur
Education in Imphal
2018 establishments in Manipur
Educational institutions established in 2018
State universities in India